Port Maria is the capital town of the Jamaican parish of Saint Mary.

Originally named "Puerto Santa Maria", it was the second town established by Spanish settlers in Jamaica. The ruins of Fort Haldane, built 1759, overlook the town.

It has a population of approximately 7,500 people.  include St Mary's Parish Church, built in 1861, and the St Mary courthouse, a Georgian structure built in 1820 which now houses the Port Maria civic centre. Jamaica's first Prime minister Alexander Bustamante was put on trial for manslaughter with Frank Pixley  at the courthouse in 1947. They were acquitted.

Port Maria is the birthplace of Sports Illustrated model Georgianna Robertson.

, the Mayor is Levan Ainsworth Freeman.

Notable buildings
St Mary courthouse, a Georgian structure built in 1820. Jamaica's first Prime minister Alexander Bustamante was tried in 1947 for manslaughter with Frank Pixley at the courthouse. They were acquitted.  After a fire gutted the building in 1988, it was rebuilt maintaining the original style and reopened as the Port Maria Civic Centre in 2000.
 St Mary's Parish Church, built in 1861

See also
Otram River
Paggee River
Frontier Estate
Trinity plantation

References

Populated places in Saint Mary Parish, Jamaica